Jacob Hoffman or Jake Hoffman may refer to:
 Jacob Hoffman (rabbi) (died 1956), German rabbi
 Jake Hoffman (actor) (born 1981), American actor
 Jake Hoffman (Arizona politician), Arizona state representative
 Jake Hoffman (American football) (1895–1977), NFL player
 Jacob Hoffman (musician) (died 1974), American xylophone player